Asahel Grant  (August 17, 1807 – April 24, 1844) was one of the first American missionaries to Iran.

Asahel Grant was born at Marshall, New York,  studied medicine at Pittsfield, Massachusetts, and practiced in Utica, New York. In 1835 he went as a missionary with the American Board of Commissioners for Foreign Missions to Iran. He settled at Urmia and worked among the Nestorians there and elsewhere in western Asia. He died in Mosul in the Ottoman Empire. He was a daring adventurer throughout the Middle East, but had little success in converting the fierce Nestorians, whom he considered among the "ten lost tribes" of Israel. He wrote The Nestorians and an appeal for Christian doctors to engage in missionary work.
Like David Livingstone before him (although not as famous), Grant thrilled western audiences with his adventures, inspiring a number of biographies, including those cited on this page. His success as a physician not only saved his life on several occasions, but opened the way for missionary successors.

Books
The Nestorians, or the Lost Tribes (1841)
Memoir of Asahel Grant, M.D.: Missionary to the Nestorians (1847), ed. A. C. Lethrop
 Gordon Taylor, Fever and Thirst - A Missionary Doctor amid the Christian Tribes of Kurdistan, Academy Chicago Publishers 2005The Americans of Urumia'' (2021)

References 

19th-century American writers
19th-century American physicians
American Protestant missionaries
American expatriates in Iran
American expatriates in the Ottoman Empire
1807 births
1844 deaths
Protestant missionaries in Iran
Protestant missionaries in the Ottoman Empire